This is the Cabinet of Uttarakhand headed by the Chief Minister of Uttarakhand, B. C. Khanduri from 2007 to 2009.

Council of Ministers

Cabinet Ministers 

|}

Ministers of state 

|}

References

Uttarakhand ministries
2007 establishments in India
Cabinets established in 2007
Cabinets disestablished in 2009
2009 disestablishments in India
Bharatiya Janata Party state ministries